John McEnroe defeated Ivan Lendl in the final, 6–3, 6–4, 6–1 to win the men's singles tennis title at the 1984 US Open. It was his fourth US Open singles title and seventh and last major singles title overall. It was Lendl's third consecutive runner-up finish at the US Open.

Jimmy Connors was the two-time defending champion, but was defeated by his rival McEnroe in the semifinals, in the last match between the two at a major singles tournament.

Seeds

Draw

Finals

Top half

Section 1

Section 2

Section 3

Section 4

Bottom half

Section 5

Section 6

Section 7

Section 8

External links
 Association of Tennis Professionals (ATP) – 1984 US Open Men's Singles draw
1984 US Open – Men's draws and results at the International Tennis Federation

Men's singles
US Open (tennis) by year – Men's singles